Hugo Antonio Corti (born June 3, 1963 in San Martin, Santa Fé) is a retired boxer from Argentina, who competed in the middleweight division (– 71 kg). He represented his native country at the 1984 Summer Olympics in Los Angeles, California. There he was stopped in the second round by Yugoslavia's Damir Škaro. He also represented Argentina at the 1983 Pan American Games. As a professional he had 35 fights (28-1-6), from 1985 to 1994.

References

 

1963 births
Living people
People from San Martín Department, Santa Fe
Middleweight boxers
Boxers at the 1983 Pan American Games
Pan American Games competitors for Argentina
Boxers at the 1984 Summer Olympics
Olympic boxers of Argentina
Argentine male boxers
Sportspeople from Santa Fe Province